Utkineyevo (Ütken) is a rural locality (a village) in Sukkulovsky Selsoviet, Dyurtyulinsky District, Bashkortostan, Russia. The population was 143 as of 2010. There are 4 streets.

Geography 
Utkineyevo is located 13 km southeast of Dyurtyuli (the district's administrative centre) by road. Mamadalevo is the nearest rural locality.

References 

Rural localities in Dyurtyulinsky District